is a former Japanese football player.

Playing career
Daiki Hattori played for YSCC Yokohama from 2010 to 2015.

References

External links

1987 births
Living people
Waseda University alumni
Association football people from Kanagawa Prefecture
Japanese footballers
J3 League players
Japan Football League players
YSCC Yokohama players
Association football defenders